Talitsy is the name of several rural localities in Russia.

Modern localities
Talitsy, Ivanovo Oblast, a selo in Yuzhsky District of Ivanovo Oblast
Talitsy, Istrinsky District, Moscow Oblast, a village under the administrative jurisdiction of the Town of Dedovsk in Istrinsky District of Moscow Oblast; 
Talitsy, Pushkinsky District, Moscow Oblast, a village under the administrative jurisdiction of Sofrino Work Settlement in Pushkinsky District of Moscow Oblast; 
Talitsy, Nizhny Novgorod Oblast, a village in Bolshemostovsky Selsoviet of Koverninsky District in Nizhny Novgorod Oblast; 
Talitsy, Novgorod Oblast, a village in Travkovskoye Settlement of Borovichsky District in Novgorod Oblast
Talitsy, Kirillovsky District, Vologda Oblast, a selo in Talitsky Selsoviet of Kirillovsky District in Vologda Oblast
Talitsy, Vologodsky District, Vologda Oblast, a village in Kipelovsky Selsoviet of Vologodsky District in Vologda Oblast
Talitsy, Pereslavsky District, Yaroslavl Oblast, a settlement in Kupansky Rural Okrug of Pereslavsky District in Yaroslavl Oblast
Talitsy, Rostovsky District, Yaroslavl Oblast, a selo in Nikolsky Rural Okrug of Rostovsky District in Yaroslavl Oblast

Alternative names
Talitsy, alternative name of Talitsa, a village in Guryevka Selo Administrative Territory of Priluzsky District in the Komi Republic;